Yang Xi may refer to:

Yang Xi (Three Kingdoms) (died 261), Shu Han politician and writer
Yang Xi (mystic) (330– 386), Taoist mystic, writer, and calligrapher of the Jin period
Yang Xi (volleyball) (born 1956), Chinese volleyball player

See also
Yangxi (disambiguation)